Mălăiești (Romanian; , Malayeshty, Malayeshty) is one of the larger communes in the Grigoriopol sub-district, in the disputed territory of Transnistria, internationally recognised as part of the Republic of Moldova. Its name is derived from Romanian "", which means "millet or maize flour", with suffix -eşti. It is composed of two villages, Cernița (Черниця, Черница) and Mălăiești.

Notable natives
 Vladimir Beșleagă, Moldovan writer
 Boris Marian, journalist, from 2001 director of "Moldpres", the official press agency of Moldova
 Mihail Grebencea, Soviet Mathematician, Number Theorist
 Natalia Gavrilița (born 1977), Prime minister of Moldova

References

External links 
 Map
 Moldovan writer Vladimir Beşleagă 

 :ro:Mihail Grebencea 

Communes of Transnistria